Stefano Siragusa (born January 29, 1976), is an Italian executive. He is Deputy General Manager of TIM.

Early life and education
Stefano Siragusa was born in Feltre, Veneto, Italy in 1976.
He graduated cum laude in Engineering from Politecnico di Milano in 2000. 
He completed his education by obtaining an MBA cum laude from MIP and an Executive from Harvard.
During his studies, he worked as product manager for Siemens AG in Germany and Italy.

Career at BCG
In 2002 he joined in The Boston Consulting Group (BCG), working for leading industrial players in the Railway, Aerospace & Defence, Automotive, Steel and Concrete sectors in Europe, Asia-Pacific and particularly in North America where he transferred in 2005 to join the firm's Chicago office. 
In 2011 he was elected Partner & Managing Director of BCG and was appointed leader of the Industrial Goods division in Italy, Greece and Turkey. In 2012 he had, also, the responsibility to coordinate Aerospace & Defence division in Europe and Middle East. In 2013 he became a member of BCG's Global Operations Leadership Team and entrusted with the responsibility of coordinating BCG's global content agenda for Lean, Procurement and Supply Chain. In 2013 he moved to New York City.

CEO of Ansaldo STS
In 2014 he became CEO and General Manager of Ansaldo STS, a multinational company listed on the Milan Stock Exchange which delivers worldwide the mass transit and railways projects.
On November 2, 2015, Hitachi Rail Italy Investments completed the purchase of 40% of the share capital of Ansaldo STS from Finmeccanica and he was reconfirmed as CEO and General Manager. 
On May 13, 2016, Stefano Siragusa resigned.

During his management new orders grew by 160%, net results by 80%, FCOF by 90%, EBIT by 27% and revenues by about 20%.

He has been the youngest business executive who leads a listed company on the Borsa Italiana for three years.

Career at Bain & Company
On May 16, 2016, Siragusa became Senior Partner and Director of Bain & Company, with responsibilities on performance improvement in the industrial good and services practice.

Deputy General Manager of TIM 
On December 7, 2021, Stefano Siragusa became Deputy General Manager of and leads circa 35,000 resources . Stefano ensures, at Group level, 16b€ revenues, 7B€ Ebitda, 3B€ investments through the oversight of marketing and technical supply activities for the national and international market of fixed and mobile network. Stefano ensures the development of the wholesale business, through innovation, the definition of the offer, and marketing of the relative products and services. Ensures the engineering, planning, design, construction, and deployment of all the infrastructures and the effectiveness and the efficiency of all the operations required for the resiliency of both the fixed and mobile networks. Ensures the design, implementation and evolution of Information Technology, with a view to the digital transformation of the Group. Ensures caring activities, operational credit, loyalty and retention, and administrative customer management with the aim of guaranteeing the efficiency of the service maximizing customer satisfaction.

Chief Revenue, Information and Media Officer of TIM 
On July 5, 2021, Stefano Siragusa became Chief Revenue Officer of TIM. Stefano ensures, at Group level, 17b€ revenues and 7B€ Ebitda through the definition of the offer, prices, marketing plans, go to market as well as the development of the Multimedia offer, the design of ICT solutions, the marketing of products and services and the caring and credit management activities.
 On September 27, 2021, Stefano was further entrusted with the responsibility of defining the Group's offer, prices, marketing plans, go to market as well as the development of the Multimedia/Corporate/Commercial and Digital Communication/Media offer, the design of ICT solutions, the marketing of products and services and the caring and credit management activities

Chief Technology and Operating Officer of TIM
Since 5 July 2021, Stefano Siragusa was CTOO- Chief Technology and Operating Officer of TIM. Stefano has ensured, at Group level, the engineering, planning, design, construction and deployment of all the infrastructures and the effectiveness and the efficiency of all the operations required for the resiliency of both the fixed and mobile network. He led 22,000 resources, 3B€ investments, ensures revenues for 13B€ and delivers 5B€ Ebitda. He has successfully executed the Digital Transformation across whole Group's Operations: Productivity increased by + 32%, On field failures reduced by – 26%, wholesale revenues increased by 4%, Ebitda by 7% and Cash generation by 12%. Stefano Siragusa international managerial profile has allowed him to hold a series of leadership positions in the Group. Before being promoted to CTOO of the Group, Stefano Siragusa has been Chief Operating Officer. Before he has been Chief Wholesale Infrastructures Network & Systems Officer  entrusted with the responsibility of Wholesale market and Operations, Telecom Italia Sparkle, INWIT, TI San Marino, TN Fiber, Flash Fiber and Persidera. In 2018 he started his career in TIM as Chief Infrastructure Officer of the Group

Academic Roles
Since 2019 he is Member of the advisory board of Luiss Business School University.

Since 2017 he is Member of the advisory board of LUMSA University.

Since 2014 he is Adjunct Professor at Luiss University in the Digital business transformation course and in the Corporate Strategy and M&A course

Boards and Other
Since 2018 he is member of the executive committee of Confindustria-ASSTEL 

Since 2018 he is member of the Board of Persidera, Italian independent Digital Terrestrial Television Network Operator

In 2018 and 2019 Stefano Siragusa is chairman of the board of directors and Chairman of the Strategic Committee of INWIT, public listed company that operates in the field of communications infrastructure.

In 2018 and 2019 he is chairman of the Board of Directors of TI Sparkle, global telecommunication service provider.

In 2017 he is Member of the Board of Directors, Chairman of Remuneration and Nomination Committee and a Member of the Risk and Related Party Committee of the ENAV, the Italian air navigation service provider.

In 2016 he is Member of the board of directors for the IPO of ENAV SpA, the Italian air navigation service provider

In 2015 and 2016 he is chairman of the Board of Directors of Metro 5 SpA., the underground light metro[2] line in Milan, Italy

In 2015 and 2016 he is the Member of the Board of Directors and Member of the Governance Committee of Saipem SpA.,  player in engineering, drilling and construction of major projects in the energy and infrastructure sectors

In 2015 and 2016 he is Member of the Board of Directors of Marangoni SpA., developer and distributor of materials and technologies for the cold retreading of Truck & Bus tyres.

Publications
 M.IT: Develop Lean MES solutions within a pharmaceutical company, 2001
 AEI – ANIE: Lean and Just in time control policies in tire production lines: a statistical comparison, 2000
 INTERNATIONAL BIAS: Advanced Kanban in Lean Production: a mathematical perspective, 2000

References

Living people
Italian business executives
Italian businesspeople
1976 births
Polytechnic University of Milan alumni